Jolanta Beata Fedak (21 September 1960 – 31 December 2020) was a Polish politician who served as Minister of Labour and Social Policy from 2007 to 2011.

Early life and education 
Born in Żary, Fedak graduated with a degree in political science from the University of Wrocław in 1984. She later completed postgraduate studies in administration at the University of Adam Mickiewicz in Poznań in 1999, and in education management at the University of Szczecin in 2003.

Career 
Fedak joined the Polish Peasants' Party (PSL) in the 1990s, and led the party's office in Zielona Góra. She later became Deputy Marshal of the western province of Lubusz Voivodeship with a focus on social issues, and became one of the four vice-chairs of the party's executive committee.

Fedak first ran for the Sejm in 2001, then ran for the Senate in 2005; both attempts were unsuccessful. She also ran for mayor of Zielona Góra in 2006 and the Polish Senate in 2007. In the latter race, she finished ninth out of 12 candidates with 45,719 votes. Despite losing the election, she was appointed Minister of Labour and Social Policy under Donald Tusk as a result of a coalition between the PSL and Tusk's Civic Platform; she served in that position until 2011.

After her term as Labour Minister ended, Fedak was an advisor to Deputy Prime Minister Waldemar Pawlak until his term ended in 2012. Shortly afterward, Fedak was appointed as a councilor of Zakład Ubezpieczeń Społecznych. In 2014, she ran for a seat in the European parliament as a member of the PSL. While she finished first in her constituency out of 10 candidates with 6,906 votes, the party did not have enough votes as a whole; they received four seats for 13 constituencies. She was also unsuccessful in a bid for the Sejm during the 2015 parliamentary elections.

From 2015 to 2017 she managed the Provincial Fund for Water Management and Environmental Protection in Zielona Góra.

In the 2019 elections she won a seat in the Sejm and held the position until her death.

Personal life 
Fedak was married and had one daughter. She died from cancer on 31 December 2020. Władysław Kosiniak-Kamysz, the president of the PSL party who announced her death stated, "A year ago you won the coveted parliamentary seat, the next win was to be against cancer. You left too early. We will miss you."

References

1960 births
2020 deaths
Polish People's Party politicians
People from Żary
Women government ministers of Poland
Women members of the Sejm of the Republic of Poland
Members of the Polish Sejm 2019–2023
21st-century Polish women politicians
University of Wrocław alumni
University of Szczecin alumni
Deaths from cancer in Poland